Sir Richard Robert Barnett  (born 17 October 1952) is a British academic in economics and management and former Vice-Chancellor of Ulster University. He was knighted in the 2015 New Year Honours for services to higher education and business in Northern Ireland.

Footnotes

1952 births
Vice-Chancellors of Ulster University
Knights Bachelor
Living people